Martha Chizuma is Malawi's Anti-Corruption Bureau Director.  Martha Chizuma was appointed director of the anti-corruption bureau on 29 April 2021 after serving as Ombudsman since 2015. Prior to that, she served as the Senior Resident Magistrate in the courts of Malawi.

Education 
Martha Chizuma holds a Masters of Laws in International Economic Law from the University of East London and Bachelor of Laws with Honors (LLB) from University of Malawi, Chancellor College.

Controversy 
On 11 May 2021, the public appointments committee rejected the appointment of Martha Chizuma as the director of the anti-corruption bureau. Martha Chizuma was accused of being unprofessional when a phone recording between her and unidentified man was leaked. In the phone call, she alleges that judges and magistrates are also part of a corruption syndicate. Members of the diplomatic missions faulted Martha Chizuma for recruiting a United Kingdom Agency to do investigations on behalf of the anti-corruption bureau. On 6 December 2022, Chizuma was arrested in connection to a leaked audio clip in which she spoke with another person about the fight against corruption in the country. She has since been released on bail  the same day of her arrest.

References 

Living people
Year of birth missing (living people)
University of Malawi alumni
 Malawian lawyers
Malawian women in politics
Alumni of the University of East London